Events from the year 1584 in Sweden

Incumbents
 Monarch – John III

Events

Births

 10 November - Catherine of Sweden, Countess Palatine of Kleeburg, princess (died 1638)

Deaths

 15 January - Martha Leijonhufvud, politically active countess  (born 1520)

References

 
Years of the 16th century in Sweden
Sweden